Bo Vonk (born 28 March 2000) is a Dutch footballer who plays as defender for ADO Den Haag in the Eredivisie.

Career

Vonk started  her career at Sassenheim's amateur football club Ter Leede. She played with the men's team to gain experience before eventually transferring to ADO Den Haag. She was the Dutch street football champion in 2013. Her first Eredivisie match was on the 21st of December 2018 against PSV

Personal life
Vonk was born in Sassenheim.

References

Living people
Dutch women's footballers
Eredivisie (women) players
2000 births
Women's association footballers not categorized by position
ADO Den Haag (women) players